Revenue Divisions are the administrative divisions in districts of some of the Indian states. These divisions are sub-divided into mandals. There are 74 
revenue divisions in Telangana. Revenue Divisional Officer (RDO) is the head of the division.

List of revenue divisions 
There are a total of 74 revenue divisions in the state.

The below table details the revenue divisions with respect to their districts.

See also 
List of districts in Telangana

References

External links

Telangana-related lists